Since the Eretz Israel Football Association was founded in 1928, it has organised a nationwide knockout cup competition almost every football season. This cup was originally held in Mandatory Palestine and named the People's Cup, but when Israel became independent in 1948, the tournament was renamed the Israel State Cup. "Eretz" was dropped from the association's name at the same time. The present cup holders are Hapoel Beer Sheva who beat Maccabi Haifa  in Teddy Stadium at the 2022 final game.

Scheduling was initially inconsistent, but the State Cup has been a regular fixture in the Israeli football calendar since the start of the 1961–62 football season. It involves professional and amateur clubs of all standards playing against each other, creating the possibility for "minnows" to become "giant-killers" by eliminating top clubs from the tournament. Five teams have reached the final while playing in a lower division, but all have been defeated apart from Hapoel Ramat Gan, who won the cup final while a second-tier club in 2003. British police and military teams took part in large numbers during the Mandate Period, and one, British Police, won the competition in 1932. Bnei Sakhnin, the 2004 final victors, are the only side from a mostly Arab-Israeli town to have lifted the cup.

Maccabi Tel Aviv have a record 23 cup titles, followed by Hapoel Tel Aviv, who have 15, including two unmatched runs of three in a row (1937 to 1939, and 2010 to 2012). The sustained good performance of Beitar Jerusalem, the next most successful team in terms of State Cup wins with seven, is a relatively recent occurrence compared to the two major Tel Aviv clubs: Maccabi and Hapoel Tel Aviv have been consistently successful throughout the cup's history, but Beitar Jerusalem only reached their first finals in the 1970s. Hapoel Kfar Saba are presently the only club with more than one final appearance to hold an undefeated record in these matches, having won the cup final three times, every time they have reached it. By contrast, three-time finalists Shimshon Tel Aviv have yet to lift the trophy. The most decisive cup final victory was in 1942, when Beitar Tel Aviv beat Maccabi Haifa 12–1.

Winners

1922–27: Unofficial National Cups 
Starting in 1922, unofficial cup competitions were held in Mandatory Palestine on an annual, national basis under the sponsorship of Britain's military garrison there. The first national cup title was won by Lancashire Troop Haifa, and the following year a team representing the Royal Air Force detachment at Ramla won the final. The next four editions of this competition were won by a Royal Air Force team drawn from across the Mandate, which beat the Ramla side in the 1927 decider. As these cups pre-date the existence of a national football association, they are not considered official by the Israel Football Association. Between 1923 and 1927 there was also a national cup organised by the Maccabi organisation, the Magen Shimshon, but this only included Maccabi clubs.

1928–47: People's Cup

The Eretz Israel Football Association was founded in August 1928, and the first officially sanctioned national tournament was held the same year as the "People's Cup". The first People's Cup final ended with Hapoel Tel Aviv and Maccabi Hasmonean Jerusalem sharing the trophy following an incident involving an ineligible Hapoel player. Tel Aviv clubs dominated the cup during this period, with Beitar, Hapoel and Maccabi Tel Aviv winning all but two of the annual competitions. The Jerusalem-based British Police side won in 1932 and Maccabi Petah Tikva lifted the cup three years later. During this period Hapoel Tel Aviv won three cup titles in a row between 1937 and 1939, which remains a record to this day. At the end of the Mandate period, Maccabi Tel Aviv were the most successful team in the national cup, with six final wins; their city rivals Hapoel followed with five. The People's Cup trophy was stolen at the end of the chaotic 1947 final and has never been recovered.

1943–45: Unofficial "War Cup"
In the 1943 and 1944–45 seasons, during the Second World War, a version of the competition called the "War Cup" was held which was not considered official by the Israel Football Association. Despite this, the People's Cup trophy was awarded after the 1943 final to the victorious team of British artillerymen, Gunners. The 1944–45 War Cup was controversial both at its beginning and at its end—it was boycotted from the start by clubs of the Beitar organisation and its final match, held on 13 January 1945, was abandoned. With Hapoel Tel Aviv leading Hapoel Petah Tikva 1–0 with one minute remaining, one of the Hapoel Petah Tikva players began targeting the referee with abusive and obscene language. The official sent the offending player off, but he vehemently refused to leave the pitch, causing significant disruption. The referee abandoned the match and declared the 1–0 scoreline final. Nowadays, the IFA recognize these cup editions as part of the competition's history.

1948–present: Israel State Cup

With the termination of the British Mandate and the foundation of the State of Israel in 1948, the association dropped "Eretz" from its name, renamed its cup competition the Israel State Cup and commissioned a new trophy. The scheduling of the cup was initially sporadic, and several editions took well over a year to complete—over the 15 seasons between 1951–52 and 1964–65 only 11 competitions took place. Two clubs from Haifa, Hapoel and Maccabi, won their first cup finals in successive years, starting with Maccabi Haifa in 1963. Bnei Yehuda Tel Aviv first lifted the trophy in 1968, and Hakoah Ramat Gan did the same a year later. Maccabi Tel Aviv lifted the cup three times during the 1960s, and brought their overall tally to 14 with a further final win in 1970.

Bnei Yehuda became the first club from outside the top division to reach the final in 1978, but they were unable to overcome league champions Maccabi Netanya, who lifted the cup for the first time with this victory. Three more teams won their first cup titles during the 1970s: Hapoel Kfar Saba, and Beitar and Hapoel Jerusalem. Two small-town clubs, Hapoel Yehud and Hapoel Lod, won the cup for the first time in 1982 and 1984 respectively, but otherwise the 1980s cup finals were the domain of sides from the cities of Jerusalem and Tel Aviv. Maccabi Haifa won four cup finals during the 1990s, while Maccabi Tel Aviv won two, bringing their total to 19 by the year 2000. Hapoel Be'er Sheva's cup final victory in 1997 was their first.

The 21st century began with two more cup titles for Maccabi Tel Aviv, before two seasons in a row saw respective firsts for the Israel State Cup. In 2003 Hapoel Ramat Gan became the first side to win the cup final from outside the top division, and a year later Bnei Sakhnin became the first club from a mostly Arab-Israeli town to lift the trophy. Three more second-tier clubs, Hapoel Haifa, Maccabi Herzliya and Hapoel Ashkelon, reached the final in 2004, 2005 and 2007 respectively, but none of these won the deciding match. Following Bnei Sakhnin's victory teams from Jerusalem and Tel Aviv reclaimed dominance—Maccabi Tel Aviv lifted the cup in 2005, Beitar Jerusalem won two titles in a row in 2008 and 2009 and Hapoel Tel Aviv twice in a row in 2006 and 2007, and then three times consecutively from 2010 to 2012. Hapoel Ramat Gan won the cup for the second time in 2013, this time as a top-flight club. On 9 May 2018, Hapoel Haifa won the cup, proving once and for all that Haifa is red.

Performances

Excluding unofficial competitions, 20 clubs have won the Israel State Cup. Twenty-five have been runners-up, and of these 11 are yet to win a cup final.

Six of the 20 cup-winning clubs have never lost the competition's deciding game, but only two of these have played in more than one final. Hapoel Kfar Saba have won all three finals in which they have appeared, while Hapoel Ramat Gan have appeared in two finals and won them both.

By contrast, Shimshon Tel Aviv have lost the cup final three times, every time they have played in it.

Maccabi Tel Aviv has won the trophy 24 times, being the most successful club in the competition; however, despite this success they are still disliked by most Israelis.

Performance by club

Total cup wins by city
The 20 Israel State Cup-winning sides have come from 12 cities. The most successful home city by some distance is Tel Aviv; clubs from this city have won four times as many cup titles as the next most successful in this regard, Jerusalem.

Total cup wins by district
There have been 20 winners of the Israel State Cup, from six districts. Tel Aviv District is the most successful, with over four times as many cup wins as the next most successful district, Jerusalem. Judea and Samaria Area, the Israeli district name for the Israeli-occupied West Bank excluding East Jerusalem, is the only district that has yet to produce a cup-winning side.

Footnotes

References
General
Finalists and results sourced to: 
And: 
Specific

External links
Israel Football Association

winners
Israel State Cup winners